Edward Wesley Janson (14 March 1822 - 14 September 1891) was an English entomologist who specialised in Coleoptera.

The Janson family was of Dutch origin and Edward Wesley Janson's father was the London Agent of the Dutch Rhenish Railway Company.

A keen entomologist Janson was elected  a Fellow of the Entomological Society of London in 1843. In 1850 he was appointed Curator of the collections of the Society a post he held until 1863. Then he became Librarian until 1874.

He started up his natural history business in 1852 selling books and specimens. He also became a publisher, first initiating the Journal of Entomology ( in 14 parts from 1862-1866 with Taylor and Francis), then Cistula Entomologica, ( 29 parts, from 1869–1885). He also published a volume of British Beetles in 1863 with illustrations from Curtis's)  Curtis's British Entomology.

Janson also assembled a  collection of world Elateridae "It consists of 25,000 specimens of which at least 1000 are original types. Janson purchased the collection of this family made by M. Candeze, and which was the basis of his monograph. He also bought a second collection formed by Candeze, and he possessed according to a note found anmongst his papers the collections of Latreille, Dejean, Buquet, Reiche, Laferte, Gory, Parry, Deyrolle, Schaum (part), Bakewell (including Curtis), W.W. Saunders, Mniszech, E. Brown, A. Murray, H. Clark, and Atkinson. He also had large series of specimens collected by Wallace, Bates, Buckley etc. "

The Janson company archive is conserved in the Natural History Museum, London 

His eldest son, Edward Mason Janson (1847–1880), was a famous English entomologist too, and became curator of the Entomological Society of London.

References

The History of the Collections Contained in the Natural History Departments of the British Museum Vol. II, Separate Historical accounts of the Historical Collections included in the Department of Zoology. William Clowes and Sons Ltd. London, (1906)
The Jansons, a family of entomologists, Peter Andrews
Anonym 1891 [Janson, E. W.] Entomologist's Monthly Magazine(3) 27 278.
Anonym 1891 [Janson, E. W.]  Ent. Rec. J. Var. 2 223.
Anonym 1891: [Janson, E. W.] - Entomologist 24 252.
Jordan, K. (1913) The Oriental Anthribidae of the Van de Poll collection. Novitates Zoologicae 20(2), 257–277."The family of Anthribidae of the van de Poll collection which we bought from Messrs. 0. E. Janson & Sons comprises a little over three thousand specimens, most of which came from the Oriental Region".

English entomologists
Fellows of the Royal Entomological Society
1822 births
1891 deaths